Marc Vales González (born 4 April 1990) is an Andorran footballer who plays for Spanish club Real Unión. Mainly a central defender, he can also play as a defensive midfielder.

Club career
Born in Les Escaldes, Escaldes-Engordany, Vales never competed in higher than Segunda División B during his lengthy spell in Spain, having started playing football with local Sant Julià. Subsequently, he represented FC Andorra (two spells), Sabadell B, Eivissa-Ibiza B, Binéfar and Atlético Monzón.

In the summer of 2011, Vales signed for Atlético Baleares. His first match in the third tier took place on 30 October, and he scored the game's only goal at home against Olímpic de Xàtiva.

Vales spent the vast majority of the following years in the same league – with the exception of a few months in Tercera División with FC Andorra – with Real Madrid C (who acquired him on a free transfer), Zaragoza B and Hospitalet. On 5 August 2016 he signed with Finnish side SJK until the end of the season, with the option of an additional campaign.

On 9 November 2016, SJK announced that they had agreed a new two-year contract with Vales. On 25 July 2018, he moved to the Norwegian Eliteserien with Sandefjord on a two-and-a-half-year deal.

In January 2022, Vales signed for Malaysian club Kedah Darul Aman.

He returned to Spain in 2023 to sign for Real Unión.

International career
After representing Andorra at youth level, Vales won his first cap with the full side on 26 March 2008 (one month shy of his 18th birthday), playing one minute in a 0–3 friendly home loss to Latvia. He went on to appear in more than 80 internationals.

Vales scored his first goal on 11 October 2019, as the hosts defeated ten-man Moldova 1–0 in the UEFA Euro 2020 qualifiers.

Career statistics

Club

International

 (Andorra score listed first, score column indicates score after each Vales goal)

References

External links

National team data

1990 births
Living people
People from Escaldes-Engordany
Andorran footballers
Association football defenders
Association football midfielders
Association football utility players
Segunda División B players
Tercera División players
FC Andorra players
CE Sabadell FC B players
SE Eivissa-Ibiza B players
CD Binéfar players
Atlético Monzón players
CD Atlético Baleares footballers
Real Madrid C footballers
Real Zaragoza B players
CE L'Hospitalet players
Veikkausliiga players
Seinäjoen Jalkapallokerho players
Eliteserien players
Sandefjord Fotball players
Malaysia Super League players
Kedah Darul Aman F.C. players
Andorra international footballers
Andorran expatriate footballers
Expatriate footballers in Spain
Expatriate footballers in Finland
Expatriate footballers in Norway
Expatriate footballers in Malaysia
Andorran expatriate sportspeople in Spain
Andorran expatriate sportspeople in Finland
Andorran expatriate sportspeople in Norway
Andorran expatriates in Malaysia
Real Unión footballers